The Register of Historic Parks and Gardens of Special Historic Interest in England, created in 1983, is administered by Historic England.  It includes more than 1,600 sites, ranging from gardens of private houses, to cemeteries and public parks.

There are 168 registered parks and gardens in Greater London. 18 are listed at grade I, the highest grade, 32 at grade II*, the middle grade, and 118 at grade II, the lowest grade.

There are no listed parks and gardens in the London Borough of Barking and Dagenham, the Royal Borough of Kingston upon Thames or the London Borough of Waltham Forest.



Key

Parks and gardens

Barnet

Bexley

Brent

Bromley

Camden

City of London

Croydon

Ealing

Enfield

Greenwich

Hackney

Hammersmith and Fulham

Haringey

Harrow

Havering

Hillingdon

Hounslow

Islington

Kensington and Chelsea

Lambeth

Lewisham

Merton

Newham

Redbridge

Richmond upon Thames

Southwark

Sutton

Tower Hamlets

Wandsworth

Westminster

References

Notes

Listed parks and gardens in England
Greater London